Bainbrigge  is a surname. Notable people with the surname include:

Philip Bainbrigge (1786–1862), English lieutenant-general
Thomas Bainbrigge Fletcher (1878–1950), English entomologist

See also
Bainbrigg